Megeb (Dargwa: Мия МехӀвела) is a rural locality (a selo) in Gunibsky District, Republic of Dagestan, Russia. The population was 700 as of 2010.

Geography 
Megeb is located 28 km southeast of Gunib (the district's administrative centre) by road. Shangoda and Sogratl are the nearest rural localities.

References 

Rural localities in Gunibsky District